Peter K. Hatemi is an American political scientist and Distinguished Professor of Political Science, co-fund  in Microbiology and Biochemistry at Pennsylvania State University. He is known for his research on the relationship between genetic factors and political attitudes and ideologies, the influence of narcissism on political attitudes as well as the underpinnings of violent behavior. He has also studied the relationship that other factors have to political orientations, finding that an individual's personality traits or moral foundations have no causal role in one's political orientations, but rather, that if there is a causal path, it is from political orientations to one's morals and personality traits.

References

External links
Faculty page

Living people
American political scientists
Pennsylvania State University faculty
University of Nebraska–Lincoln alumni
Behavior geneticists
Year of birth missing (living people)